Darko Jovandić (Serbian Cyrillic: Дарко Јовандић; born 4 February 1982) is a Serbian professional footballer who plays as a defender for Budućnost Srpska Crnja.

Career
After playing with Proleter Zrenjanin and Budućnost Banatski Dvor, Jovandić moved abroad and joined Azerbaijan Top League club Baku. He subsequently returned to his country and signed with Banat Zrenjanin. In early 2008, Jovandić went across the border again in order to play for Slovenian PrvaLiga side Celje.

External links
 PrvaLiga profile
 
 

Association football defenders
Azerbaijan Premier League players
Expatriate footballers in Azerbaijan
Expatriate footballers in Slovenia
FC Baku players
First League of Serbia and Montenegro players
FK Banat Zrenjanin players
FK Budućnost Banatski Dvor players
FK Kolubara players
FK Proleter Zrenjanin players
FK Timok players
NK Celje players
OFK Beograd players
Sportspeople from Pančevo
Serbian expatriate footballers
Serbian expatriate sportspeople in Azerbaijan
Serbian expatriate sportspeople in Slovenia
Serbian First League players
Serbian footballers
Serbian SuperLiga players
Slovenian PrvaLiga players
1982 births
Living people